Primrose Sands is a mixed urban and rural locality in the local government area of Sorell in the South-east region of Tasmania. The 2021 Australian Census has a population of 1209 for the state suburb of Primrose Sands.

It is a sea-side locality that lies at the northern channel between Frederick Henry Bay and Norfolk Bay. Though primarily a holiday home community, it has a large permanent population. Over 50% of houses in Primrose Sands are unoccupied most of the year.

The town is home to an Returned and Services League of Australia club, community centre and a combined store and post office.

History
Primrose Sands was gazetted as a locality in 1972.

Primrose Point, which lies in the township, was named "Point Renard" by d'Entrecasteaux, on 5 November 1792, after his surgeon, Recherche.

Geography
The shore of Frederick Henry Bay forms the western and southern boundaries, and the Carlton River forms most of the northern.

Road infrastructure
The C349 route (Primrose Sands Road) enters from the north-east and runs through to the south-west, where it ends.

References

Towns in Tasmania
Localities of Sorell Council